Mahinog, officially the Municipality of Mahinog,  is a 5th class municipality in the province of Camiguin, Philippines. According to the 2020 census, it has a population of 14,634 people.

Geography

Climate

Barangays

Mahinog is politically subdivided into 13 barangays.
 Benoni
 Binatubo (Binaliwan)
 Catohugan
 Hubangon
 Owakan
 Poblacion
 Puntod
 San Isidro
 San Jose
 San Miguel
 San Roque
 Tubod
 Tupsan Pequeño

Demographics

Economy

References

External links
 [ Philippine Standard Geographic Code]
Philippine Census Information

Municipalities of Camiguin